Ferenc Hegedűs (1856 – 15 September 1909) was a Hungarian politician, who served as Minister of Finance in 1906.

References
 Magyar Életrajzi Lexikon

1856 births
1909 deaths
Finance ministers of Hungary